The Hongqi CA770 is a limousine produced by FAW Hongqi as the successor to the Hongqi CA72. The CA770 remained in production from 1966 until 1981 albeit in limited numbers. Built on a platform based on the Chrysler Imperial, around 1,600 of these V8-engined Hongqis were built in total, and over the years various versions were released including a 1965 long-wheelbase model with three rows of seats and a 1969 armored version (CA772). A pickup truck version was also produced, with three built. A funeral hearse version was planned, but never produced. The 770 series was powered by a 215 HP Chrysler 5.6 L V8 engine, although bodywork was penned by First Auto Works.

Several modernized modifications of these cars continued to be built in limited numbers until the mid-1990s. The whole range was replaced by the Hongqi Mingshi and its derivatives, which were based on a Chinese built version of the Audi 100.

Models 
CA770C: Right-hand drive version of the CA770G. Like the CA770G, the interior and engine were from the first-generation Lincoln Town Car. One built in 1987.
CA770G: CA770 with 5.8 L Ford (351 ci) engine, Lincoln Town Car steering wheel and tachometer. 25 built from 1985 to 1988.
CA770J: Convertible based on the full-length CA770 chassis. Mainly used in parades, the rear seats were raised so that the passengers could stand with the top down. Five built from 1965 to 1972. One example, the CA770JG, featured a large glass panel to protect the passengers.
CA770TJ: Landaulet version. Two built in 1984 for the 35th anniversary of the founding of the People's Republic of China.
CA770L: Combi version. Three built.
CA770JH: Ambulance version. The basic shape was retained, but the trunk lid was raised (which also raised the rear window) to allow easier access for a stretcher. Three built.
CA771: Short wheelbase version. It featured two rows of seats (instead of three) and was  shorter. 127 (or 129) built from 1967 to 1971.
CA772: Armored version. The engine was bored out to 8.0L and tuned to 300 hp. The body featured 8 mm thick armor to with stand light machine gun fire. The windows were 65 mm thick bulletproof glass. 15 built from 1969 to 1972; 12 remained in China, while the other three were exported (one to North Korea, another to Cambodia, and the third to Vietnam).
CA773: Short wheelbase version. It was  shorter than the CA770 and featured two rows of seats. Unlike the CA771, the CA773 featured a window between the rear door and the D-pillar. 297 built from 1969 to 1976.
CA7560: The last CA770-based model. The earlier models had an interior similar to the original CA770, but with some interior parts from the Peugeot 504. The later models had much of the interior from the Audi 100/200. The engine was also from the CA770. 20 built from 1992 to 1995.
CA7400: Remake of the Hongqi CA770 with a lowered roofline based on the 1998–2011 Lincoln Town Car. Prototype was made in 2004.

References

External links

Official website 
https://blogs.wsj.com/chinarealtime/2013/06/17/hongqi-how-mao-zedong-and-deng-xiaoping-rolled/

CA770
Cars of China
Cars introduced in 1966
Limousines
Luxury vehicles
Flagship vehicles
Full-size vehicles
Rear-wheel-drive vehicles